Nande Yer was a Papua New Guinean rugby league footballer who represented Papua New Guinea at the 1995 World Cup.

Early life 
Nande Yer was born about 1970 in Ialibu, a small village in the Southern Highlands Province of what was then the Territory of Papua and New Guinea, under the control of Australia. His cousin, Raymond Kahl, is also a Papua New Guinean footballer.

Playing career
Yer played for the Mendi Muruks and represented the Northern Zone in 1991 against the touring Great Britain Lions. He played eleven tests for Papua New Guinea between 1992 and 1996.

In 2001 he served as a selector for the Mendi Muruks.

Death 
Yer died on 1 December 2012, at the Port Moresby General Hospital after a heart attack. He is survived by his wife, Bida, and three children, Brownwin, Norberta, and Makena.

References

Papua New Guinean rugby league administrators
Papua New Guinean rugby league players
Papua New Guinea national rugby league team players
Mendi Muruks players
Rugby league props
Rugby league second-rows
Year of birth missing
2012 deaths